The Godz is the self-titled debut album by American hard rock band The Godz (from Columbus, Ohio), released in 1978. It contains their most notable radio hit, "Gotta Keep a Running".

The album was reissued and remastered on CD by UK-based company Rock Candy Records.

Track listing 

"Go Away" – 4:29 (Eric Moore)
"Baby I Love You" – 4:17 (Eric Moore)
"Guaranteed" – 3:33 (Glen Cataline)
"Gotta Keep a Running" – 7:27 (Eric Moore)
"Under the Table" – 3:43 (Mark Chatfield)
"Cross Country" – 7:03 (Mark Chatfield/Glen Cataline)
"Candy's Going Bad" - 10:38 (George Kooymans/Barry Hay)

Credits 
 Bob Hill - guitar, keyboard, vocals
 Mark Chatfield – guitar, vocals
 Eric Moore – bass, vocals
 Glen Cataline – drums, vocals

Production 
 Producer: Don Brewer
 Engineer: Mark Stebbeds

Notes 
 The band wanted to name the album Rock & Roll Machine, but later learned of the name already having been used by the Canadian hard rock band Triumph on their second album released in 1977.
 "Candy's Going Bad" is a cover song of Dutch rock band Golden Earring from their album Moontan (1973).
 Producer Don Brewer is best known to rock and roll fans for being the drummer in Grand Funk Railroad.

References

1978 debut albums